Kay Kirkpatrick (September 13, 1954) is an American politician who is a member of the Georgia State Senate for the 32nd district, a district which includes portions of Cobb and Fulton counties. She is a member of the Republican Party.

Kirkpatrick graduated from the University of Kentucky and the University of Louisville School of Medicine. She worked as an orthopedic surgeon.

On May 16, 2017, Kirkpatrick won a special election to succeed longtime state Sen. Judson Hill, R-Marietta, who had held the seat since 2005 and resigned to run for Congress. Kirkpatrick's margin of victory in the General Election was 57–43. She was sworn into office on June 2, 2017.

On March 20, 2020, Kirkpatrick announced she had tested positive for COVID-19, and said she was recovering without complications.

References

External links

Living people
Republican Party Georgia (U.S. state) state senators
University of Kentucky alumni
University of Louisville School of Medicine alumni
American orthopedic surgeons
Kentucky women in politics
Kentucky women in health professions
American women physicians
21st-century American politicians
21st-century American women politicians
Women state legislators in Georgia (U.S. state)
1954 births